Seán Daniel Treacy (22 September 1923 – 23 March 2018) was an Irish Labour Party politician who served as Ceann Comhairle of Dáil Éireann from 1973 to 1977 and 1987 to 1997. He served as a Teachta Dála (TD) for the Tipperary South constituency from 1961 to 1997. He also served as a Member of the European Parliament (MEP) for the Munster constituency from 1981 to 1984.

Political career
Author R. M. Douglas wrote that Treacy was a party member of fringe Fascist group Ailtirí na hAiséirghe during the 1940s. However, by the 1960s Treacy had moved to the ideological left, albeit he was still considered to be socially conservative. Treacy was first elected to the Dáil at the 1961 general election, as a Labour Party TD for the Tipperary South constituency. He was re-elected there in seven subsequent elections, and returned automatically in three more owing to his having been elected by the Dáil as Ceann Comhairle. He was elected to that office first after the 1973 general election for one term, then after the 1987 general election for three. As Ceann Comhairle, he was a member of the Irish Presidential Commission during the presidential vacancies of 1974 and 1976.

He served as an MEP from 1981 to 1984, replacing Eileen Desmond who resigned as an MEP when she was appointed Minister for Health and Minister for Social Welfare.

He was expelled from the Labour Party in 1985 for voting against the family planning bill, which would have liberalised the sale of contraception in the Republic of Ireland. He was elected as an independent TD at the 1987 general election. After that election, he was elected as Ceann Comhairle by the Dáil. One of his first acts was to exercise his casting vote in favour of the nomination of Charles Haughey as Taoiseach. Treacy retired from politics at the 1997 general election, the only Ceann Comhairle to retire from the position at an election, rather than exercising his right of automatic re-election.

He died in Waterford on 23 March 2018, at the age of 94. His funeral, which was attended by President Michael D. Higgins, Taoiseach Leo Varadkar and former Minister Martin Mansergh, was held on 26 March 2018.

References

External links

1923 births
2018 deaths
Local councillors in South Tipperary
Labour Party (Ireland) TDs
Independent TDs
Members of the 17th Dáil
Members of the 18th Dáil
Members of the 19th Dáil
Members of the 20th Dáil
Members of the 21st Dáil
Members of the 22nd Dáil
Members of the 23rd Dáil
Members of the 24th Dáil
Members of the 25th Dáil
Members of the 26th Dáil
Members of the 27th Dáil
Presiding officers of Dáil Éireann
MEPs for the Republic of Ireland 1979–1984
Labour Party (Ireland) MEPs